South Dakota Highway 271 (SD 271) is a  state highway in the north-central part of the U.S. state of South Dakota. It connects portions of northeast Walworth County with the northeastern part of Campbell County.

It consists of two disconnected segments. The southern segment extends from U.S. Route 12 (US 12) south of Java to a rural intersection at the Walworth–Campbell county line, northeast of Selby. The northern segment begins at an intersection with SD 10 west of Eureka and ends at an intersection with 102nd Street at the North Dakota state line. Here, the roadway continues as 26th Avenue SE.

The northern segment was previously SD 105 prior to the mid-1970s.

Route description

Walworth County
SD 271's southern segment begins at an intersection with US 12 (134th Street) south of Java. Here, the roadway continues to the south as 314th Avenue. SD 271 heads due north on 314th Avenue and skirts along the western edge of Java. At an intersection with the eastern terminus of SD 130 (130th Street), SD 271 turns right onto 130th Street and travels to the east, while 314th Avenue continues to the north. SD 271 skirts along the northern edge of the town. At the northeastern edge of Java, it curves to the north, onto 315th Avenue, and continues to the north. Almost immediately, it crosses over some railroad tracks of BNSF Railway. The highway curves to the west, onto 125th Street, and then almost immediately back to the north on 315th Avenue. The highway continues to the north until it reaches the Campbell County. Here, this segment ends, the roadway intersects 124th Street, and continues to the north as 315th Avenue.

Campbell County
SD 271 resumes at an intersection with SD 10 (112th Street) west of Eureka. Here, the roadway continues as 319th Avenue to the south. SD 271 travels north on 319th Avenue and then crosses over Spring Creek just before traveling just to the east of Artas. It curves to the west onto 102nd Street and then back to the north on 317th Avenue. After a slight eastward bend, SD 271 reaches its northern terminus, an intersection with 102nd Street at the North Dakota state line. Here, the roadway continues to the north as 26th Avenue SE.

History

Major intersections

See also

References

External links

The Unofficial South Dakota Highways Page: Highways 201+

0271
Transportation in Walworth County, South Dakota
Transportation in Campbell County, South Dakota